The Smuts Professorship of Commonwealth History was established on 25 October 1952 as the Smuts Professorship of the History of the British Commonwealth; it was retitled in 1994. The professorship is assigned to the Faculty of History at the University of Cambridge.

List of Smuts Professors of Commonwealth History
Philip Nicholas Seton Mansergh (1953-1970)
Eric Thomas Stokes (1970-1981)
Donald Anthony Low (1983-1994)
A. G. Hopkins (1994-2002)
Megan Vaughan (2002-2016)
Saul Dubow (2017–)

References

Commonwealth History, Smuts
School of the Humanities and Social Sciences, University of Cambridge
1952 establishments in England
Commonwealth History, Smuts